Edward Keble Chatterton (10 September 1878 – 31 December 1944) was a prolific writer who published around a hundred books, pamphlets and magazine series, mainly on maritime and naval themes.

Biography
Born at number 76, Rock Street, Sheffield, England, he attended Sheffield Royal Grammar School followed by St Paul's School, then located in Hammersmith, London. He took a B.A. at St. Stephen's House, Oxford, before beginning to write theatre and art reviews for various magazines. In 1905, he edited The Lady's Realm for a number of issues.

He undertook a number of small-boat voyages through the English Channel and the Netherlands; out of these voyages came magazine articles and books describing the passages as well as several books on the maritime art collections of the Low Countries.

At the outbreak of World War I, Chatterton joined the Royal Naval Volunteer Reserve (R.N.V.R.), ultimately commanding a Motor Launch flotilla at Queenstown, now Cobh, in Ireland. He describes these years in Q-Ships and their Story (1922), The Auxiliary Patrol (1924) and Danger Zone: The Story of the Queenstown Command (1934). He left the service in 1919 with the rank of Lieutenant Commander.

In the inter-war years, his output was continuous, and included a series of monographs on model ships, many narrative histories of naval events, and a number of juvenile novels. Most of his books were republished in the United States and several were translated into French and German editions.

A member of the Royal Thames Yacht Club for many years, he carried out a multi-season voyage to the Mediterranean through the French canals. He described these in a further series of books: his journeys on the Canal de Nantes à Brest are outlined in Through Brittany in "Charmina": From Torbay to the Bay of Biscay in a 6-Tonner (1933), journeys on the Canal du Midi are described in To the Mediterranean in "Charmina" (1934), and journeys along the French Riviera are described in "Charmina" on the Riviera (1937).

After 1939, his writings focused on the conflict with Germany. Hutchinsons published a series documenting the Royal Navy at war, which was completed by Kenneth Edwards following Chatterton's death in 1944.

Published works
 Sailing Ships. London : Sidgwick & Jackson, 1909.
 Down the Channel in the "Vivette". London : Sidgwick & Jackson, 1910.
 at Internet Archive
 King's Cutters and Smugglers 1700-1855. London : George Allen & Company, Ltd., 1912.
 Through Holland in the Vivette. London : Seeley, Service & Co., 1913.
 Ships and Ways of Other Days. London : Sidgwick & Jackson, 1913.
 Ventures and voyages. London : Rich & Cowan, 1928.
 Through Brittany in "Charmina". London : Rich & Cowan, 1933.
 Sailing models ancient & modern. London : Hurst & Blackett Ltd, 1934.
 Ship Models. London : Studio Ltd, 1923.
 The story of the British Navy mills and boon, 1911

Notes

External links
 
 
Bibliography at Bruzelius.info
 
 
 
 

1878 births
1944 deaths
Royal Navy officers of World War I
Writers from Sheffield
British military writers
People educated at St Paul's School, London
People educated at Sheffield Grammar School